The Lubiane is a small river that flows through the Alpes-Maritimes department of southeastern France. It flows entirely within the town of Vence. It is a right tributary of the Cagne.

References

Rivers of France
Rivers of Alpes-Maritimes
Rivers of Provence-Alpes-Côte d'Azur